Valentino Müller (born 19 January 1999) is an Austrian professional footballer who plays as a midfielder for WSG Tirol in Austrian Bundesliga. He was born in Lustenau.

Career

LASK
On 3 June 2019 LASK confirmed that Müller had joined the club on a four-year contract.

WSG Tirol
On 27 July 2021 he moved to WSG Tirol on a long-term contract.

References

External links
Valentino Müller at LASK's website

1999 births
People from Lustenau
Footballers from Vorarlberg
Living people
Austrian footballers
Austria youth international footballers
Austria under-21 international footballers
Association football midfielders
SC Rheindorf Altach players
LASK players
FC Juniors OÖ players
WSG Tirol players
Austrian Football Bundesliga players
Austrian Regionalliga players